The Sinkha Project is a series of digital comics and multimedia novels created by Marco Patrito, an Italian science-fiction author and illustrator  who has published comic novels in Italy, France, Germany, Sweden, Belgium, Holland and North America since 1984. He has drawn more than 150 cover illustrations for Italian publisher Arnoldo Mondadori Editore.

The Sinkha Universe, originally conceived by Patrito in early 1991, was used as a set for the first Sinkha multimedia novel, which was completely realized using ground-breaking 3D computer graphics over the course of five years. In 1995, the Sinkha CD-ROM was finally distributed by Virtual Views in Europe, USA and Japan for Mac OS and Windows operating systems.

Episodes 
As of 2008, the Sinkha Project is composed of four multimedia novels (Episodes 0, 1, 2 and 3) and three graphic novels (Episodes 1, 2 and 3). The printed versions are available in Italian, French, Portuguese and German languages. Episodes 0 and 1 were also published in English on special issues of the American magazine Heavy Metal.

Sinkha 0: First Encounter [1995] 

Sinkha tells the story of Hyleyn, a bold girl who lives in the mysterious city of Thalissar. This gigantic and gloomy agglomeration of howling metal, located on the hostile planet Ogon, proves to be of great interest to the Sinkha, a race of immortals who send their living starship Darcron to investigate.

Presented as the first multimedia novel completely realized in 3D computer graphics; although it was published in 1993, Donna Matrix, by Mike Saenz, is credited as the first digital graphic novel utilizing 3D rendering. Sinkha was released in 1995 for Mac OS 7, Windows 3.1 and Windows 95. It features 8-bit graphics and a monaural soundtrack. It specifically requires QuickTime 2 and does not work properly on recent operating systems, although it is possible to run it via emulators like Basilisk and DOSBox.

In 1998, Marco Patrito was approached by a Hollywood film producer wanting to turn Sinkha into a movie. Patrito was asked to draw up a "feature film treatment" based on the novel, with the addition of some variants. The draft was approved and pre-production started, but budget troubles quickly arose. A non-negotiable clause was that the movie would have to be done entirely in computer graphics, which at the time were very expensive. When the estimated figure (over twenty million dollars) was judged to be insufficient, a proposal was made to use real and affordable actors that were not overly famous, but the situation stalled. It was impossible to move beyond that impasse, and the project was ultimately abandoned.

However, in 2002, the second multimedia novel, Hyleyn, included an abridged version of Sinkha based on the synopsis of this aborted movie. Subtitled First Encounter, it contained fewer, but enhanced (although static) CG artworks, as well as an expanded description of the original events.

In 2008, the original Sinkha was remastered with 24-bit graphics and a full stereophonic soundtrack. It was re-released as Sinkha Zero.

The music of Episode 0 was composed by the neo-prog band Fancyfluid (Sandro Bruni and Fabrizio Goria).

Sinkha received a score of 2 out of 5 from MacUser. The author praised the graphics, but heavily criticized the story, noting that "the writing is, well, even more stilted and sloppy than that of the average graphic novel."

Sinkha 1: Hyleyn [2002] 

As an added bonus, Hyleyn includes an abridged version of Sinkha which contains fewer but enhanced (although static) CG artworks, as well as an expanded description of the original events.

The music of Episode 1 was composed by Ettore Cimpincio.

Sinkha 2: Atmosphere [2007] 
Episodes 2 and 3 were released together on a single CD-ROM. The disc contains two bonus features: an Extra section in which Marco Patrito explains the genesis of the Sinkha Project, and a second section which offers a detailed presentation of the Sinkha Universe.

The music of Episode 2 was composed by Bjørn Lynne, Nery Bauer and Jacek Dojwa.

Sinkha 3: Planet of the Clouds [2007] 
Episodes 2 and 3 were released together on a single CD-ROM. The disc contains two bonus features: an extra section in which Marco Patrito explains the genesis of the Sinkha Project, and a second section which offers a detailed presentation of the Sinkha Universe.

The music of Episode 3 was composed by Bjørn Lynne, Nery Bauer and Jacek Dojwa.

Authoring 
The Sinkha Project was created and realized by Marco Patrito, with the collaboration of Fabio Patrito and Tullio Rolandi. Some works and suggestions were contributed by Flavio Chirico and Francesco Chirico (Episode 0), Laura Patrito, Maurizio Manzieri (all Episodes), Marco Rolandi (Episode 1), Daniele Totolo (Episodes 1 and 2) and Massimo Zuanazzi (Episode 2).

Episode 0 was developed on Macintosh with the following tools:
 Strata Studio
 Adobe Photoshop
 Adobe After Effects
 Macromedia Director
 Apple QuickTime

All other Episodes were developed on PC with the following tools:
 Wavefront Maya
 Autodesk 3DS Max
 Adobe Photoshop
 Adobe After Effects
 Macromedia Director

References

External links 
 Sinkha - official website
 Virtual Views - Sinkha's publisher
 Marco Patrito - official website
 Maurizio Manzieri - official website
 Shockwave Sound - Bjørn Lynne's music library
 Delos Cyberzine - a review of Sinkha (8-bit version)

Science fiction graphic novels